Michael Keller is an American independent filmmaker. He was the writer, director, cinematographer, and editor for the film Red Gold, a social crime drama about the illegal organ trade.

Red Gold was shown at various international film festivals and profiled in New Jersey Stage, and premiered at the Garden State Film Festival in Atlantic City, New Jersey, on April 5, 2014. It won "Best International Thriller" at the 2014 Manhattan Film Festival, and received a "rave" review by Film Threat.

Filmography
Red Gold (Producer)

References

External links

Red Gold Teaser
 Rogue Cinema interview 

Living people
American male screenwriters
Place of birth missing (living people)
Film producers from California
Year of birth missing (living people)
Film directors from Los Angeles
Screenwriters from California